Knapton is a village  west of York in the City of York unitary authority area and ceremonial county of North Yorkshire, England. It is bounded by the village of Acomb to the east, the B1224 to the south, the A59 to the north and the A1237 York Outer Ring Road to the west.

History
There are records of a settlement here from Saxon times, but the first mention of Knapton is in the Domesday Book. In 1843 the village had a population of 113 in an area of approximately 883 acres made up mainly of farmhouses. The Lord of the manor at this time was Sir William Eden.

In the sixteenth century, the village was a detached part of the parish of Holy Trinity, Micklegate in York. It became a separate civil parish in 1866.  In 1974 the parish was transferred from the West Riding of Yorkshire (which included the Ainsty of York) to the Harrogate district in the new county of North Yorkshire. In 1988 the civil parish was absorbed into the civil parish of Rufforth, and the parish was subsequently renamed Rufforth with Knapton. In 1996 the parish was transferred to the City of York.

Governance
Knapton is part of the Rural West York Ward of the Unitary Authority of the City of York. As of the 2019 elections it is represented by Councillors Anne Hook and James Barker who are both members of the local Liberal Democrat Party. It is part of the UK Parliamentary Constituency of York Outer. Until January 2020 it also fell within the boundaries of the Yorkshire and the Humber European Parliament constituency. It is part of the Parish Council of Rufforth and Knapton and, as of 2010, is represented by Peter Williams and Dick Syms. Before 1996, the village was administered by Harrogate Borough Council.

Community

The current population is estimated to be 222 in approximately 96 households.

The only permanent amenity in the village is the Red Lion Public House. Local shopping, sports and religious services are served in nearby Acomb. Children of primary school age attend Poppleton Ousebank County Primary School in Upper Poppleton. The Eddie Brown/Harrogate Connexions Bus route 412 from Wetherby to York calls in the village however this service is every two hours in each direction and only operates Monday to Saturday.

References 

Villages in the City of York
Former civil parishes in North Yorkshire